The "Crash! Boom! Bang! World Tour" was the fourth concert tour by Swedish pop music duo Roxette, launched in support of their fifth studio album Crash! Boom! Bang! (1994).

Box office and commercial recordings
The "Crash! Boom! Bang! Tour" saw the band performing to over one million people during its eighty-plus concerts throughout Europe, South Africa, Australia, Asia and Latin America from September 1994 until May 1995. It saw Roxette becoming one of the first international acts to perform in territories which, in the mid-90s, were not seen as touring markets, including Indonesia, Singapore, Thailand, the Philippines and China, as well as Costa Rica, Venezuela, Chile, Peru and Russia. These concerts attracted some criticism from the European music press – particularly in Sweden – who accused the band of exploiting the people of those countries for financial gain.

Per Gessle dismissed these claims, saying: "There's been some irritation over us going to Beijing and Moscow but, I don't know, we have lots of fans everywhere—we do this for our fans, we don't do it for the money because there's no money there", conceding: "We're not going to be the generation of artists that's gonna, you know, 'cash-in' from the Chinese people. That belongs to the future [generation of artists]." Marie Fredriksson argued: "I get so pissed off with all these people who don't understand that this is a really good thing we are doing. It's for the fans, of course it's for us too, because we learn so much. It's not like 'We have to go. It's a big market. We can sell a lot of albums there.'"

They became the second act to tour in post-Apartheid South Africa, playing four shows to 65,000 people in stadiums throughout the country in January 1995. Whitney Houston was the first act to tour there, and her shows the previous month had been plagued by organisational issues: thousands of ticket holders were unable to find their seats and, due in part to poor security, hundreds of concertgoers were openly robbed outside Johannesburg's Ellis Park Stadium. In contrast, Roxette's four concerts in the country passed off without incident, which was instrumental in other international acts deciding to perform there soon after—specifically The Rolling Stones and Phil Collins. Their 14 January 1995 show at Johannesburg's Ellis Park Stadium was filmed for the live video Crash! Boom! Live!.

Rarities, a compilation of previously released b-sides, demos and remixes, was issued exclusively in Latin America and Southeast Asia, with its release timed to coincide with dates of the tour. On 19 February 1995, Roxette performed to over 15,000 people at the Workers Indoor Arena in Beijing. The procedure to get permission for this concert had taken over a year, and included self-censoring the lyrics of "Sleeping in My Car", of which Gessle said: "We agreed, but didn't change them in the end." This made Roxette the first Western act to be allowed to perform in China since Wham! in 1985.

Two months later, on 8 April, they performed the first of two scheduled concerts at Buenos Aires' Estadio Ricardo Etcheverry – then called the Ferrocarrill Oeste Stadium – to a sold-out crowd of over 30,000 fans. Approximately 150 attendees were treated for minor injuries at the venue, however, after a reported crowd rush toward the stage during the concert. The second concert the following night was cancelled over security concerns. The tour concluded on 2 May 1995 in Moscow, with Roxette becoming the first act since 1917 to hold a concert on that date—a public holiday in Russia. In 2008, the duo were ordered to pay SEK 4.5 million (approximately US $500,000) in unpaid taxes to the Swedish Tax Agency, for money earned during the German dates of the tour. In court papers, it was alleged that Gessle and Fredriksson paid the revenue into their joint production company, instead of declaring it as taxable income.

Set list
This set list is representative of the tour's second show on 9 September 1994 at the Globen Arena in Stockholm. It does not represent all dates throughout the tour.

 "Sleeping in My Car"
 "Fireworks"
 "Almost Unreal"
 "Dangerous"
 "So You Want to Be a Rock 'n' Roll Star" (The Byrds cover)
 "Crash! Boom! Bang!"
 "Listen to Your Heart"
 "The First Girl on the Moon"
 "Harleys & Indians (Riders in the Sky)"
 "Lies"
 "The Rain"
 "I Love the Sound Of Crashing Guitars"
 "It Must Have Been Love"
 "Fading Like a Flower (Every Time You Leave)"
 "Dressed for Success"
 "The Big L."
 "Spending My Time"
 "Cry"
 "Hanging on the Telephone" (The Nerves cover)
 "The Look"
 "Love Is All (Shine Your Light on Me)"
 "Joyride"

Notes
 "I Love the Sound of Crashing Guitars" was played up until the end of 1994. From the South African shows onwards, it was replaced on the set by "Run to You".

Tour dates

Cancelled dates

Personnel
Personnel taken from the credits of the 1995 tour documentary Really Roxette.

Musicians
 Marie Fredriksson – vocals, electric guitar, piano
 Per Gessle – vocals, rhythm guitar, harmonica
 Per "Pelle" Alsing – drums and percussion
 Mickael "Nord" Andersson – electric and pedal steel guitars
 Anders Herrlin – bass
 Jonas Isacsson – acoustic and electric guitars
 Clarence Öfwerman – keyboards
 Mats Persson – drums and percussion

Management
 Dave Edwards – tour manager
 Åsa Gessle – PA to Per Gessle
 Bo Johansson – security
 Thomas Johansson – tour management
 Bill Leabody – production manager
 Tor Nielsen – tour coordinator

Production
 Fredrik All – stage carpenter
 Mattias Dalin – sound engineer
 Lisa Derkert – wardrobe
 Lars Jungmark – monitor engineer
 Pontus Lagerbielke – lighting designer
 Max Lökholm – guitar technician
 Anders Mikkelsen – guitar technician
 Stefan Rubensson – guitar technician
 Mats Wennersten – keyboard technician

References

Roxette concert tours
1994 concert tours
1995 concert tours